Rodna (formerly Rodna Veche;) is a commune in Bistrița-Năsăud County, Transylvania, Romania. It is composed of two villages, Rodna and Valea Vinului (Radnaborberek).

Its name is derived from a Slavic word, ruda, meaning "iron ore", originally being known as Rudna in 14th century documents.

History 

During the Late Middle Ages, the Transylvanian Saxon-inhabited village was sacked by the Mongols during their invasion of the Kingdom of Hungary.

Between 1711 (Treaty of Szatmar) and 1918, Rodna was part of the Austrian monarchy, province of Transylvania; in Transleithania after the compromise of 1867.
A post-office was opened in 1856, later named Ó-Radna ("Old Rodna").

Natives
Florian Porcius
Francisc Zavoda
Vasile Zavoda

References

Communes in Bistrița-Năsăud County
Localities in Transylvania
Mining communities in Romania
Place names of Slavic origin in Romania